Hervé Godignon (born 22 April 1952) is a French equestrian and Olympic medalist. He was born in Paris. He won a bronze medal in show jumping at the 1992 Summer Olympics in Barcelona.

References

1952 births
Living people
French male equestrians
Olympic equestrians of France
Olympic bronze medalists for France
Equestrians at the 1992 Summer Olympics
Equestrians at the 1996 Summer Olympics
Sportspeople from Paris
Olympic medalists in equestrian
Medalists at the 1992 Summer Olympics
20th-century French people